Palio is a genus of sea slugs, dorid nudibranchs, shell-less marine gastropod molluscs in the family Polyceridae.

Species 
Species in the genus Palio include:
 Palio amakusana (Baba, 1960) 
 Palio dubia (M. Sars, 1829)
 Palio fujitai (Baba, 1937)
 Palio gracilis (Pease, 1971)
 Palio nothus (Johnston, 1838)
 Palio pallida (Bergh, 1880) 
 Palio zosterae (O'Donoghue, 1924)  eelgrass polycera

References

External links

Polyceridae
Taxa named by John Edward Gray